Colin Forsyth ( – 31 May 2018) was an English professional rugby league footballer who played in the 1960s, 1970s and 1980s. Colin Forsyth broke his arm in the 1974–75 season.

Playing career

International honours
Colin Forsyth won caps for England while at Bradford Northern in the 1975 Rugby League World Cup against France, New Zealand, and Wales.

Premiership Final appearances
Colin Forsyth played in Bradford Northern's 17-8 victory over Widnes in the Premiership Final during the 1977–78 season, the 2-24 defeat by Leeds in the Premiership Final during the 1978–79 season, and the 5-19 defeat by Widnes in the Premiership Final during the 1979–80 season.

Championship appearances
Colin Forsyth played in Bradford Northern's victory in the Championship during the 1979–80 season.

Challenge Cup Final appearances
Colin Forsyth was a reserve to travel in Featherstone Rovers' 17-12 victory over Barrow in the 1966–67 Challenge Cup Final during the 1966–67 season at Wembley Stadium, London on Saturday 13 May 1967, in front of a crowd of 76,290

County Cup Final appearances
Colin Forsyth played right-, i.e. number 10, in Featherstone Rovers' 12-25 defeat by Hull Kingston Rovers in the 1966–67 Yorkshire County Cup Final during the 1966–67 season at Headingley Rugby Stadium, Leeds on Saturday 15 October 1966, and played right- (replaced by  interchange/substitute Graham Joyce) in Bradford Northern's 18-8 victory over York in the 1978–79 Yorkshire County Cup Final during the 1978–79 season at Headingley Rugby Stadium, Leeds on Saturday 28 October 1978.

John Player Trophy Final appearances
Colin Forsyth played right-, i.e. number 10, in Bradford Northern's 6-0 victory over Widnes in the 1979–80 John Player Trophy Final during the 1979–80 season at Headingley Rugby Stadium, Leeds on Saturday 5 January 1980.

Club career
Colin Forsyth made his début for Featherstone Rovers on Friday 22 April 1966.

Personal life and death
Colin Forsyth is the father of the rugby league  who played in the 2000s for York Wasps, Doncaster and York City Knights; Craig Forsyth.

References

External links
Statistics at orl-heritagetrust.org.uk

1947 births
2018 deaths
Bradford Bulls players
England national rugby league team players
English rugby league players
Featherstone Rovers players
Oldham R.L.F.C. players
Rugby league props
Rugby league players from York
Wakefield Trinity players